Your Honor is an Indian thriller drama streaming television series, directed by Eeshwar Nivas, under the production house Applause Entertainment. The series stars Jimmy Shergill, Pulkit Makol, Mita Vashisht, Yashpal Sharma and Parul Gulati in the main roles. Despite its name being similar to the American adaptation, the series is adaptated from Israeli TV series Kvodo. The story follows a judge who lets go of his moralities, relationships and goes on to undermine ethics in order to save his son. The series was released on June 18, 2020, on the Indian OTT platform of SonyLIV.

Your Honor season 2 was released on November 19, 2021. Gulshan Grover and Mahie Gill are the new major additions to the show.

Premise

Season 1

The story of the series revolves around Bishan Khosla (Jimmy Shergill) and his son. Bishan's son Abeer gets caught in a hit and run case. The boy who is hit in this case by Abeer is the son of the city gangster. Bishan Khosla sacrifices relationships and subverts the law to save his son from a vengeful gangster. The series portrays how even the pinnacle of law breaks in order to save their family.

Season 2

After Judge Bishan Khosla shot Satnam Mudki, he finds himself in serious trouble, not only with the Mudki family but also the Tarn Taran mafia and Pandit gang that understands the importance of having a High Court Judge in its pocket.

Cast
Main casts
 Jimmy Shergill as Bishan Khosla
 Pulkit Makol as Abeer Khosla
 Richa Pallod as Indu Samthar
 Mita Vashisht as Kiran Sekhon
 Varun Badola as Kaashi Samthar
 Kunj Anand as Harman Mudki

Season 1
 Parul Gulati as Ruma Pathak
 Suhasini Mulay as Sheel Tandon, Khosla's Mother-in-law
 Yashpal Sharma as Pandit
 Parag Gupta as Guddan alias Shashi Tiwari
 Mahabir Bhullar as Satbir Singh Mudki
 Bikramjeet Kanwarpal as Judge Punchhi
 Taniya Kalra as Amrita Singh, Sports teacher of Abeer's college

Season 2
 Mahie Gill as Yashpreet
 Gulshan Grover as Gurjot
 Zeishan Quadri as Jagda
 Bhumika Dube as Latika, Pandit's widow
 Gagan Deep Singh as Sub Inspector Mandeep, Sekhon's subordinate
 Akriti Singh as Mahi, Abeer's love interest
 Nazim Khan as Jailor Dalal

Release
The trailer was released on June 13, 2020, and later the series was premiered on June 18, 2020.

Reception
Saibal Chatterjee from NDTV praised the performances of the cast stating "Mita Vashisht is brilliant. Varun Badola stands tall in the guise of a family man forced by circumstances to stoop low". Jyoti Kanyal from India Today expressed in her review on the series as a gripping tale of lies and manipulations. Arushi Jain from The Indian Express shared her first impressions on the series stating "The climax of every episode leaves you at the edge-of-your-seat, and the thrills keep coming as the episodes pass". Nandini Ramnath from Scroll.in explained and stated how the series depicts that the family comes before law.

References

External links
 
 Your Honor on SonyLIV

Indian web series
2020 web series debuts
2020 web series endings
Courtroom drama television series